Theophilos Erotikos was an 11th-century Byzantine general, and governor in Serbia and Cyprus, where he led a short-lived rebellion in 1042.

Biography

Serbian revolts
Around 1034, according to John Skylitzes, the Serbs renounced Byzantine rule; Stefan Vojislav, a Serbian lord that held Zeta and Ston, organized a revolt while the Byzantines arranged the succession of the throne. Vojislav was defeated and imprisoned in Constantinople, and his holdings were restored under the control of Erotikos, who had the title "strategos of Serbia". Vojislav however managed to escape his imprisonment at the Byzantine capital, and organized another revolt in late 1037 or early 1038, targeting the pro-Byzantine Serbian lords in the neighbouring regions of Duklja: Travunija and Zahumlje. Vojislav managed to expel Erotikos and asserted himself as "Prince of the Serbs".

Cyprus
Erotikos was nevertheless appointed as governor of Cyprus, and in 1042, at the death of Michael V and the resulting turmoil in the imperial government, he decided to take advantage of the situation: he incited the local populace to revolt, especially against the local krites (senior fiscal and judicial official), who was accused of excessive taxation and murdered by the rebels. The new emperor, Constantine IX Monomachos, sent a fleet under Constantine Chage, which quickly suppressed the rebellion and arrested Erotikos. The rebel was brought to Constantinople, where he was paraded on horseback in the Hippodrome dressed in women's clothes. After this public humiliation, his estates and fortune were confiscated, but Erotikos himself was set free.

References

Sources 
 
 
 
 

11th-century Byzantine military personnel
Byzantine governors of Cyprus
Byzantine rebels
11th century in Serbia
Byzantine Serbia